is a town located in Kamikawa Subprefecture, Hokkaido, Japan.

As of September 2016, the town has an estimated population of 3,845 and a density of 44 persons per km2. The total area is 87.29 km2.

Pippu is notable for its ski slopes in winter and strawberries in summer.

Climate

Culture

Mascot

Pippu's mascot is  aka . She is a strawberry who loves skiing.

References

External links

Official Website 

Towns in Hokkaido